Røyken og Hurums Avis (The Røyken and Hurum Gazette) is a local Norwegian newspaper covering the municipalities of Røyken and Hurum in Buskerud county.

Røyken og Hurums Avis was launched in 1976, when it was called Hurumposten (The Hurum Gazette), later renamed Smånytt fra Røyken og Hurum (Little Gazette from Røyken and Hurum). The newspaper is published twice a week, on Tuesdays and Thursdays. Its office has been located in Sætre since 2003, after it moved from Slemmestad. It is edited by Svein Ove Isaksen. Røyken og Hurums Avis is fully owned by Drammens Tidende, which is part of the company Edda Media.

Circulation
According to the Norwegian Audit Bureau of Circulations and National Association of Local Newspapers, Røyken og Hurums Avis has had the following annual circulation:
 2006: 3,193
 2007: 3,192
 2008: 3,391
 2009: 3,541
 2010: 3,711
 2011: 3,695
 2012: 3,790
 2013: 3,872
 2014: 3,668
 2015: 3,639
 2016: 3,572

References

External links
Røyken og Hurums Avis homepage

Newspapers published in Norway
Norwegian-language newspapers
Røyken
Hurum
Mass media in Buskerud
Publications established in 1976
1976 establishments in Norway